Dysspastus mediterraneus is a moth of the family Autostichidae and subfamily Symmocinae . It is found on Sicily.

References

Moths described in 1957
Dysspastus
Moths of Europe